Aleksandr Georgiyevich Medakin (born September 23, 1937January 14, 1993) was a Soviet football player.

Honours
 Soviet Top League winner: 1960.
 Soviet Cup winner: 1960.
 Top 33 players year-end list: 1959, 1960, 1961.

International career
Medakin made his debut for USSR on May 21, 1961, in a friendly against Poland. He played in the 1962 FIFA World Cup qualifiers, but was not selected for the final tournament squad.

External links
  Profile

1937 births
1993 deaths
Soviet footballers
Soviet Union international footballers
FC Torpedo Moscow players
FC Chornomorets Odesa players
FC Shinnik Yaroslavl players
Soviet Top League players
Russian footballers
Association football defenders